Mimacraea marginata is a butterfly in the family Lycaenidae. It is found in Tanzania.

References

Butterflies described in 2000
Poritiinae
Endemic fauna of Tanzania
Butterflies of Africa